Weidinger is a surname. Notable people with the surname include:

Andreas Weidinger (born 1970), German composer, producer, conductor, and arranger for film, television and records
Anton Weidinger (1766–1852), Austrian trumpeter
Christine Weidinger (born 1946), American operatic soprano
Otto Weidinger (1914–1990), SS commander in Nazi Germany